Draconis, also known as Draco, is a fictional character from the soap-opera Os Mutantes - Caminhos do Coração. He is a villain with the power to generate and manipulate fire and one of the primary antagonists of the series.

Personality
Draco is short-tempered compared to his powers and easily gets angered. He tends to underestimate his enemies no matter how powerful they are compared to him. Fellow mutant villain Tele is a brother figure to him, since they were raised together and are fond of each other. Draco is also deeply attracted to the villainess Gorgon and constantly bickers with her new boyfriend, Metamorpho. He kills without much concern, having killed police officer Martha who sacrificed herself to protect the other agents and shows no remorse.

Powers and abilities
Pyrokinesis - fire manipulation.

Fictional mutants
Fictional mass murderers
Fictional assassins